Ace is an unincorporated community in Polk County, Texas, United States. According to the Handbook of Texas, the community had an estimated population of 40 in 2000.

Ace is located along FM 2610 in southern Polk County, approximately 75 miles northeast of Houston. Ace has a post office with the ZIP code 77326.

Public education in the community is provided by the Livingston Independent School District.

References

Unincorporated communities in Polk County, Texas
Unincorporated communities in Texas